Eivind Lund (May 15th 1914 in Drammen - May 27th 1984) was a Norwegian painter.

He started his education in 1935 at Kunst und Dekorationsfachschule in Hamburg and Schule Reimann and Erno Wacklawek in Berlin. In 1951 he went to Paris and became a student of André Lhote and Académie Julian. In 1951 he was also accepted at Le Salon in Paris and exhibited two paintings at Société Nationale des Beaux-Arts in 1952. He has exhibited four times at Høstutstillingen in Oslo. Lund has had several solo shows and also taken part in group shows in Norway, Sweden, Denmark and Finland. In 2010 he was selected for the exhibition "Drammenskunstnere gjennom 200 år" (Drammen Artists through 200 Years) at Drammens Museum. His work has been purchased by amongst other Drammen Faste Galleri, The American Embassy, Sykehuset Buskerud, Drammen Council and Drammens Tidende. Eivind Lund had many positions in Drammens Kunstforening and served on the board from 1949 to 1967.

References 

Jubileumsutstilling Catalogue, Drammens Kunstforening, 10–23 May 1984
Jubileumsutstilling, Drammenskunstnere gjennom 200 år, Drammen by 1811-2011. Drammens Museum, Drammen, 2010, pp. 54–55.

People from Drammen
1984 deaths
1914 births
20th-century Norwegian painters